Ademar Alberto Novo Caballero (2 December 1918 – 25 March 1982) was an Olympic backstroke swimmer from Brazil, who participated at one Summer Olympics for his native country. At the 1936 Summer Olympics in Berlin, he swam the 100-metre backstroke, not reaching the finals.

References

External links
 

1918 births
1982 deaths
Brazilian male backstroke swimmers
Swimmers at the 1936 Summer Olympics
Olympic swimmers of Brazil
20th-century Brazilian people